Axonopsidae is a family of mites belonging to the order Trombidiformes.

Genera:
 Estellacarus Habeeb, 1954
 Neobrachypoda Koenike, 1914
 Woolastookia Habeeb, 1954

References

Trombidiformes